The Our Lady of Loreto Cathedral , also called Mendoza Cathedral, is located in Mendoza, Argentina. It was a chapel in the nineteenth century and built as an interim cathedral in 1934.

The original cathedral located in the Old Town was destroyed by an earthquake in 1861. Its replacement was planned for the New Town opposite the Plaza Independencia, but after construction began it had to be demolished, targeting the land to the construction of another building.

The Archbishopric is undertaking the construction of a new cathedral, Christ the Redeemer, in Central Park. Until work is completed on that project, the Church of Our Lady of Loreto continues to serve as a cathedral, despite its capacity of 500 people being insufficient to serve the city of Mendoza.

See also
Roman Catholicism in Argentina
Our Lady of Loreto

References

Roman Catholic cathedrals in Argentina
Buildings and structures in Mendoza, Argentina
Cathedrals in Argentina
Roman Catholic churches completed in 1934
20th-century Roman Catholic church buildings in Argentina